Deedar-E-Yaar is a 1982 Hindi-language romance film, produced by Prasan Kapoor under the Tirupati Pictures Enterprises banner and directed by Harnam Singh Rawail. It stars Jeetendra, Rishi Kapoor, Rekha, Tina Munim  and music composed by Laxmikant-Pyarelal.

Plot
Javed Sayeed Ali Khan (Rishi Kapoor) meets Sikander Alam Changezi (Deven Verma), who is the brother of Firdous Changezi (Tina Munim). Javed loves Firdous and he gives a love letter to Firdous in Sikander's hand, not knowing that he is her brother. He asks Javed to stay away from his sister, but he doesn't do that and he entered his room as a servant. But Firdous knew him at the time of going. He takes her photograph, but Firdous came to his home and takes the photo, and both fall in love. They are living in the city of Lucknow, where culture, courtesies, and the Nawabi way of life has remained its hallmark. Nawab Akhtar Nawaz Khan's (Jeetendra) sister Nazima's husband Jahang every day goes to Husna's Kotha and he decides to marry her. To save his sister's family from disaster, Akhtar frequents the Kotha of Husna (Rekha). Jahang decides to kill Akhtar, but he fails. Javed saves him and they become friends. At the jewellery shop, Akhtar sees Firdous for the first time and he falls in love on one side, unaware of the fact, that Akhtar and Javed love the same girl and promise to help each other in winning their respective loves. Both meet her in a fair and Javed decides to marry Firdous. When they all came back to Lucknow, Ali Nawab Mirza Firhad Ali Changezi (Shreeram Lagoo) said to Javed that he can't marry Firdous because of his family. Then to help his friend Javed, Akhtar decides to marry Firdous, without knowing that Firdous is his lover and then divorce her, then Javed can marry her. Both are ready to do that. When Akhtar marries Javed's lady love, he discovers to his shock that she is none other than his lover. Here, Husna promises to Akhtar that after the marriage of Akhtar, she will leave dance in Kotha and commit suicide. After coming to know that Firdous is nothing but Javed's love and Akhtar also loves her, Akhtar tells Javed that he will not divorce Firdous. What happened to Javed? Can Javed get his lady love Firdous? Can Akhtar divorce Firdous?

Cast
Jeetendra as Nawab Akhtar Nawaz Khan
Rishi Kapoor as Javed Sayeed Ali Khan
Rekha as Husna Bai
Tina Munim as Firdous Changezi
Reena Roy as Special Appearance 
Deven Varma as Sikander Alam Changezi
Shreeram Lagoo as Nawab Mirza Firhad Ali Changezi
Urmila Bhatt as Mrs. Changezi
Nirupa Roy as Mrs. Khan (Akhtar's Mother)

Soundtrack 
Music Composed by  Laxmikant-Pyarelal, lyrics written by Indeevar, Kaifi Azmi, Sahir Ludhianvi and Amir Meenai.

References

External links 
 

1980s Hindi-language films
Films directed by H. S. Rawail
Films scored by Laxmikant–Pyarelal